Armando Preti (February 19, 1911 – ?) was an Italian professional football player.

He played for two seasons (six games, three goals) in the Serie A for A.S. Roma.

References

1911 births
Year of death missing
Italian footballers
Serie A players
A.S. Roma players
U.S. Lecce players
A.C. Perugia Calcio players
Pisa S.C. players
Association football forwards